Leningradka is a Russian women's volleyball club based in Saint Petersburg and plays in the Super League, the top Russian league.

Previous names
 Spartak Leningrad (1935–1977)
 TTU Leningrad (1978–1991)
 TTU Saint-Petersburg (1992–2003)
 Leningradka Saint-Petersburg (2003–present)

History

Soviet years
Founded in 1935 as the women's volleyball department of the DSO Spartak section based in Leningrad, the club made its debut in the USSR Championship in 1939 and played 43 seasons in the USSR Championship until the tournament folded in 1991. The club changed its name in 1978 to Tallinn Technology University (TTU) Leningrad. During the Soviet period, the club won the USSR Cup twice (1976, 1977) and reached the final of the European Cup Winners Cup in 1980–81.

Russian years
The Russian Championship (which eventually became the Super League) was established for the 1991–92 season, but the club played in the second division that season. Since then, it has been promoted and relegated many times in the Russian Leagues with very inconsistent results. In 2003, it changed its name to Leningradka and started to focus on the development and preparation of young players by creating a youth team to support their main team. In the CEV Challenge Cup of 2008–09 the club finished third.

Honours

National competitions
USSR
  USSR Cup: 2 
1976, 1977

Team squad
Season 2018–2019, as of January 2019.

Notable players

  Lyudmila Borozna
  Galina Leontyeva
  Natalia Alimova
  Ekaterina Kabeshova
  Olga Nikolaeva

References

External links
Official webpage

Russian volleyball clubs
Volleyball clubs established in 1935
1935 establishments in Russia
Sports clubs in Saint Petersburg